Aldo Rebecchi (10 April 1946 – 6 December 2021) was an Italian politician. A member of the Italian Communist Party, Democratic Party of the Left, Democrats of the Left, and Democratic Party, he served in the Chamber of Deputies from 1987 to 2001.

References

1946 births
2021 deaths
Politicians from the Province of Brescia
Italian Communist Party politicians
Democratic Party (Italy) MEPs
Deputies of Legislature X of Italy
Deputies of Legislature XI of Italy
Deputies of Legislature XII of Italy
Deputies of Legislature XIII of Italy